Phil Campbell may refer to:

People
 Phil Campbell (agricultural commissioner), (1917–1998), American farmer and politician
 Phil Campbell (musician) (born 1961), British guitarist, member of Motörhead
 Phil Campbell (writer) (born 1972), American author and documentary producer
 Phil Campbell, Scottish musician and former member of the band The Temperance Movement

Places
Phil Campbell, Alabama, a town in the United States

See also
 Philip Campbell (disambiguation)